The 71st Division was one of the divisions of the People's Army of the Republic that were organized during the Spanish Civil War on the basis of the Mixed Brigades. It came to operate on the Andalusian and Extremadura fronts.

History 
The unit was created in September 1937, on the Andalusian coastline. Its headquarters were in Albuñol. Some time after its creation the division was integrated into the XXIII Army Corps. Later it became a reserve of the Andalusian Army. In May 1938 members of the division led the liberation of more than three hundred republican prisoners from Carchuna, in the nationalist rear. In mid-August 1938 the Republican command sent it as reinforcement to the Extremadura front, to the sector defended by the 29th Division.

Command 
Commanders
 Bartolomé Muntané Cirici;
 Luis Bárzana Bárzana;
 José Torralba Ordóñez;
 Carlos Cuerda Gutiérrez;

Commissars
 José Piñeiro Zambrano, of the CNT;

Chiefs of Staff
 Frumencio Sanmartín López;

Organization

References

Bibliography 
 
 
 
 
 

Military units and formations established in 1937
Military units and formations disestablished in 1939
Divisions of Spain
Military units and formations of the Spanish Civil War
Military history of Spain
Armed Forces of the Second Spanish Republic
1937 establishments in Spain
1939 disestablishments in Spain